The Tailteann Cup is a second tier Gaelic football championship competition held annually since 2022 and organised by the Gaelic Athletic Association (GAA). It is contested by those county teams who do not qualify for the All-Ireland Senior Football Championship and the winner is awarded the Tailteann Cup.

The name 'Tailteann' comes from the ancient Tailteann Games.

Background
Following ongoing one-sided matches in the All-Ireland Senior Football Championship between counties of differing standards, the Gaelic Athletic Association (GAA) began considering the addition of a tournament for so-called weaker counties who were usually eliminated in the early stages of their respective provincial championship. At a national conference in November 2018, the GAA found broad support for the introduction of a second-tier championship and canvassed options for its potential structure and future inclusion within the annual calendar. One year later at a specially convened congress, 76% of delegates formally approved of the second-tier tournament. The tournament was named the Tailteann Cup in February 2020 and it was intended it would hold its inaugural season that year, though its introduction was ultimately delayed until 2022 due the impact of the COVID-19 pandemic on Gaelic games over that period.

Second and third-tier competitions have been incorporated in hurling for several years, such as the Christy Ring Cup and Nicky Rackard Cup.

Format
Up to 17 teams compete in the cup. The teams are drawn from the bottom 16 rankings from that season's National Football League, plus New York. However, if a team in this position qualifies for the final of its provincial championship, that team continues to compete in the same year's All-Ireland Senior Football Championship and does not compete in the Tailteann Cup. 

The teams that compete in the Tailteann Cup are split into four round-robin groups, and the top two teams from each group proceed to one of four knockout quarter-finals matches, followed by semi-finals and the final. The Winners of the four Quarter Final pairings qualify for the semi-finals, with pairings decided via an open draw. The final of the Tailteann Cup is currently scheduled three weeks before the All-Ireland Football Final, and is staged at Croke Park in Dublin. 

For the inaugural 2022 Tailteann Cup, the format was altered to a straight-knockout competition with Round 1 and the Quarter Finals organised on a geographical basis with Northern and Southern Sections. From 2023 onwards, there are scheduled to be no North/South sections.

Unlike the contest for the Sam Maguire Cup, London and New York are permitted to meet each other in the contest for the Tailteann Cup.

List of Finals

Roll of honour

Team records and statistics

Team results

Legend
  – Champions
  – Runners-up
  – Semi-Finals
  – Quarter-Finals/Round 1/Preliminary Round
 AI – All-Ireland Senior Football Championship

For each tournament, the number of teams in each tournament (in brackets) are shown.

By semi-final appearances
Years in bold represent years qualified to final.

See also
 Gaelic Athletic Association
 All-Ireland Senior Football Championship
 Tommy Murphy Cup

References

External links
 GAA.ie
 Tailteann Cup Hogan Stand

 
2022 establishments in Ireland
All-Ireland organisations
Gaelic football leagues in Ireland
Recurring sporting events established in 2022
Senior inter-county Gaelic football competitions